Igor Vladimirovich Sergeyev (born 30 April 1993) is an Uzbek professional footballer who plays as a forward for FC Tobol and Uzbekistan national team.

Club career

Pakhtakor 
Sergeyev made his Uzbek League debut for Pakhtakor Tashkent on 5 March 2011 against Qizilqum Zarafshon at the Pakhtakor Markaziy Stadium coming on as a 90th-minute substitute for Temurkhuja Abdukholikov as Tashkent won the match 2–0.

Beijing Guoan 
On 6 July 2016, Sergeyev was loaned to Beijing Guoan F.C. joining his national team teammate Egor Krimets. On October 16, he received his first goal during 2016 season in the match Beijing Guoan vs Changchun Yatai.

Return to Pakhtakor 
On 6 July 2018, Sergeyev returned to Pakhtakor Tashkent.

Aktobe
On 18 February 2021, FC Aktobe announced the signings of Sergeyev.

Tobol
On 19 July 2021, Sergeyev left Aktobe to sign for Tobol.

International career
Sergeyev had established himself as a regular at the under-20 level for Uzbekistan. After the 2012 AFC U-19 Championship Sergeyev came out as the top scorer of the tournament with 7 goals throughout as he led Uzbekistan's U20s to the semi-finals, where they lost to South Korea U20s 3–1.

He made his debut for main team, Uzbekistan on 10 September 2013 in 2014 FIFA World Cup qualification match against Jordan. He was named in Uzbekistan's squad for 2015 AFC Asian Cup, held in Australia. Sergeyev played  three matches and scored Uzbekistan's 1–0 winning goal against North Korea in their opening match in Group B.

During the FiFa 2018 Russia World Cup Qualification, Igor scored many goals, significantly helping his national side beat many nations. Igor Sergeyev, 22, has established a reputation as one of Asia's most promising stars by scoring regularly for both club and country. The young forward has racked up 40 goals to keep Pakhtakor on course to win their 11th title in the domestic league. He has shown similarly impressive form in the qualifying campaign too, with three goals so far. He scored against North Korea in June, 2015. Then, showed his true powers in a match against Philippines, scoring 2 goals, ending with a score of 5-1 win for Uzbekistan. The Pakhtakor young striker would put the game beyond any doubt by completing a brace five minutes past the hour mark.

Career statistics

Club

International

Statistics accurate as of match played 20 November 2022.

International goals
Scores and results list Uzbekistan's goal tally first.

Honours

Club
Pakhtakor Tashkent
 Uzbek League (4): 2012, 2014, 2015, 2019
 Uzbek League runner-up: 2011
 Uzbek Cup (2): 2011, 2019

Tobol
 Kazakhstan Premier League (1): 2021

International
Uzbekistan U-19
 AFC U-19 Championship semifinal:  2012

Individual
 AFC U-19 Championship top scorer: 2012 (7 goals)
 Uzbek League Top Scorer: 2015 (24 goals)

References

External links
 

Igor Sergeev- Soccerpunter

1993 births
Living people
Sportspeople from Tashkent
Uzbekistani footballers
Pakhtakor Tashkent FK players
Beijing Guoan F.C. players
Chinese Super League players
Expatriate footballers in China
Uzbekistani expatriate sportspeople in China
Expatriate footballers in the United Arab Emirates
Uzbekistani expatriate sportspeople in the United Arab Emirates
Uzbekistani people of Russian descent
Uzbekistani people of Korean descent
Uzbekistan international footballers
2015 AFC Asian Cup players
Association football forwards
Footballers at the 2014 Asian Games
Al Dhafra FC players
UAE Pro League players
Uzbekistan Super League players
Asian Games competitors for Uzbekistan